Patriarch Joseph of Constantinople may refer to:

 Joseph I of Constantinople, Ecumenical Patriarch in 1266–1275 and 1282–1283
 Joseph II of Constantinople, Ecumenical Patriarch in 1416–1439